Jingfu is a town under the administration of Jingdong Yi Autonomous County in Yunnan, China. , it has 13 villages under its administration:
Guli Village
Tangliqing Village
Gongping Village
Zhuqing Village
Jinjilin Village
Zhaoqishan Village
Lujia Village
Longshan Village
Huisi Village
Mengpian Village
Chahe Village
Mengling Village
Hushan Village

References 

Towns of Pu'er City
Jingdong Yi Autonomous County